For definition and discussion of the genre, see Operetta.

Operettas by composer:

Paul Abraham (1892–1960)
 Victoria und ihr Husar (1930)
 Die Blume von Hawaii (1931)
 Ball im Savoy (1932)
 Roxy und ihr Wunderteam (1936)

Leo Ascher (1880–1942)
 Hoheit tanzt Walzer (1912)

Ralph Benatzky (1884–1957)
 Meine Schwester und ich (1930)
 Im weissen Rössl (1930)
 Bezauberndes Fräulein (1933)

Leonard Bernstein (1918–1990)
 Candide (1956)

Paul Burkhard (1911–1977)
 Hopsa (1935, revised 1957)
 Feuerwerk (Der schwarze Hecht) (1950)

Alfred Cellier (1844–1891)
Dorothy, 1886
The Mountebanks, 1892

Noël Coward (1899–1973)
 Bitter Sweet (1929)

Rudolf Dellinger (1857–1910)
 Don Cesar (1885)

Anton Diabelli (1781–1858)
 Adam in der Klemme

Nico Dostal (1895–1981)
 Clivia (1933)
 Monika (1937)
 Die ungarische Hochzeit (1939)
 Manina (1942)

Edmund Eysler (1874–1949)
 Bruder Straubinger (1903)
 Die gold'ne Meisterin (1927)

Leo Fall (1873–1925)
 Der fidele Bauer (1907)
 Die Dollarprinzessin (1907)
 Brüderlein fein (1909)
  (1912)
 Madame Pompadour (1923)

Harold Fraser-Simson (1872–1944)
 The Maid of the Mountains (1917)

Rudolf Friml (1879–1972)
 The Firefly (1912)
 Rose-Marie (1923)
 The Vagabond King (1925)

Edward German (1862–1936)
The Emerald Isle, 1901
Merrie England, 1902
Tom Jones, 1907
Fallen Fairies, 1909

Jean Gilbert (1879–1942)
 Die keusche Susanne (1910, revised 1953)

Walter Goetze (1883–1961)
 Ihre Hoheit, die Tänzerin (1919)
 Der goldene Pierrot (1934)

Bruno Granichstaedten (1879–1944)
 Der Orlow (1925)

Victor Herbert (1859–1924)
 The Fortune Teller 
 Mlle. Modiste
 Naughty Marietta (1910)
 Sweethearts (1913)
 Babes in Toyland
 The Red Mill

Hervé, Pen-name of Florimund Ronger (1825–1892)
Les chevaliers de la Table Ronde 1866
L'œil crevé 1867
Chilpéric 1868
Le petit Faust 1869
 Mam'zelle Nitouche (1883)

Richard Heuberger (1850–1914)
 Der Opernball (1898)

Jenő Huszka (1875–1960)
 Tilos a bemenet (No entry)
 Bob herceg (Prince Bob)
 Aranyvirág
 Gül Baba
 Tündérszerelem (Fairly love)
 Rébusz báró (Baron Rebus)
 Erzsébet (Elisabeth)
 Lili bárónö (Baroness Lili)
 Mária föhadnagy (Corporal Maria)
 Gyergyoi bál (Ball in Gyergyo)
 Szép Juhászné (The nice Mrs Juhasz)
 Szabadság, szerelem (Freedom and love)

Victor Jacobi (1883–1921)
 A rátartós királykisasszony
 Legvitézebb Huszár (The Brave Hussar)
 Leányvásár (The Marriage Market)
 Szibill

Georg Jarno (1868–1920)
 Die Försterchristel (1907)

Leon Jessel (1871–1942)
 Das Schwarzwaldmädel (1917)

Emmerich Kálmán, also known as Imre Kálmán (1882–1953)
 Tatárjárás (The Gay Hussars) (1909)
 Obsitos (The soldiers on Leave)
 Der Zigeunerprimas (The Gipsy violinist)
 The Blue House
 Gold gab ich für Eisen
 Die Csárdásfürstin (The Csardasprincess) (1915)
 Die Faschingsfee 
 Das Hollandweibchen
 Die Bajadere
 Gräfin Mariza (Countess Mariza) (1924)
 Die Zirkusprinzessin (The Circus Princess)(1926)
 Golden Down 
 Die Herzogin von Chicago (The Duchess of Chicago)
 Das Veilchen von Montmartre
 Der Teufelsreiter
 Kaiserin Josephine
 Marinka
 Arizona Lady

Rudolf Kattnigg (1895–1955)
 Balkanliebe (1937)

Walter Kollo (1878–1940)
 Drei alte Schachteln (1917)
 Die Frau ohne Kuss (1924)

Reginald De Koven (1859–1920)
 The Knickerbockers
 Robin Hood
 Rob Roy
 Rip Van Winkle

Fritz Kreisler (1875–1962)
 Sissy (1932)

Eduard Künneke (1885–1953)
 Das Dorf ohne Glocke (1919)
 Der Vetter aus Dingsda (The Cousin from Nowhere) (1921)
 Liselott (1932)
 Glückliche Reise (1932)

Hans Lang (1908–1992)
 Lisa, benimm dich! (1939)

Charles Lecocq (1832–1918)
 Fleur de thé (1868)
 La fille de Madame Angot (1871)
 Les cent vierges (1872)
 Giroflé-Girofla (1874)
 Le petit due (1878)
 La petite mademoiselle (1879)
 Le Jour ella nuit (1881)
 La princesse des Canaries (1883)

Franz Lehár (1870–1948)
 Wiener Frauen (Women from Vienna)
 Der Rastelbinder
 Göttergatte
 Juxheirat
 Die lustige Witwe (The Merry Widow) (1905)
 Der Mann mit drei Frauen (The man with three wives)
 Fürstenkind 
 Der Graf von Luxemburg (1909)
 Zigeunerliebe (The gipsy love) (1910)
 Eva
 Die ideale Gattin (The Ideal Wife)
 Endlich allein (Finally alone) (1914)
 Sternglücker
 Wo die Lerche singt
 Die blaue Mazur
 Tangokönigin (The queen of tango)
  (Spring)
 Frasquita (1922)
 La danza delle Libelulle - Libellentanz
 Die gelbe Jacke (1923)
 Clo-clo
 Paganini (1925)
 Gigolette
 Der Zarewitsch (The Tsarevich) (1927)
 Friderike (1928)
 Das Land des Lächelns (The Land of Smiles) (1929)
 Schön ist die Welt (The World is nice) (1931)
 Giuditta (1934)

Ruggero Leoncavallo (1857–1919)
 La jeunesse de Figaro 
 Malbrouck 
 La reginetta delle rose 
 Are you there?
 La candidata 
 Prestami tua moglie 
 Goffredo Mameli 
 A chi la giarrettiera? 
 Il primo bacio 
 La maschera nuda

Paul Lincke (1866–1946)
 Frau Luna (1899)

André Messager (1853–1929)
Les p'tites Michu, 1897
Véronique, 1898
Monsieur Beaucaire, 1919
Coups de roulis, 1928

Carl Millöcker (1842–1899)
 Das verwunschene Schloss (1878)
 Die Dubarry (1879, major revision (T. Mackeben) 1938)
 Der Bettelstudent (1882)
 Gasparone (1884)
 Der arme Jonathan (1890, revised (W. Felsenstein) 1959)

Oskar Nedbal (1874–1930)
 Polish Blood (Polská krev) (1913)
 The Vendage (Vinobraní) (1916)

Edmund Nick (1891–1974)
 Das kleine Hofkonzert (1935)

Ivor Novello (1893–1951)
 The Dancing Years (1939)
 Glamorous Night (1935)
 King's Rhapsody (1942)
 Perchance to Dream (1945)

Jacques Offenbach (1819–1880)
Ba-ta-clan, 1855
La chatte métamorphosée en femme, 1858
 Orpheus in the Underworld (Orphée aux enfers) 1858, revised 1874
Geneviève de Brabant, 1859, revised 1867
Le pont des soupirs 1861
M. Choufleuri restera chez lui le . . ., 1861
 La belle Hélène 1865
Barbe-bleue, 1866
 La Vie parisienne, 1866
 La Grande-Duchesse de Gérolstein, 1867
Robinson Crusoé, 1867
L'île de Tulipatan, 1868
 La Périchole, 1868
Vert-Vert, 1869
La princesse de Trébizonde, 1869
Les brigands, 1869
Le roi Carotte, 1872
Fantasio, 1872
La jolie parfumeuse, 1873
Madame l'archiduc, 1874
Whittington, 1874
Le voyage dans la lune, 1875
Le docteur Ox, 1877
Maître Péronilla, 1878
Madame Favart, 1878
La fille du tambour-major, 1879
See also List of operettas by Jacques Offenbach

August Pepöck (1887–1967)
 Hofball in Schönbrunn (1937)

Fred Raymond (1900–1954)
 Maske in Blau (1937)
 Saison in Salzburg (Salzburger Nockerln) (1938)
 Geliebte Manuela (1951)

Sigmund Romberg (1887–1951)
 The Student Prince (1924)
 The Desert Song (1926)
 The New Moon (1928)

Hans Schanzara (1897–1984)
 Die Nachtigall (1947)

Ludwig Schmidseder (1904–1971)
 Abschiedswalzer (1949)

Friedrich Schröder (1910–1972)
 Hochzeitsnacht im Paradies (1942)

Edward Solomon (1855–1895)
 Pickwick (1889)

Petar Stojanović (1877–1957)
 Die Herzog von Reichstadt (Vojvoda od Rajhštata – The Duke of Reichstadt) 
 Devojka na Mansardi (A Girl on Terrace)
 Der Tiger (Tigar)

Robert Stolz (1880–1975)
 Der Tanz ins Glück (1921)
 Zwei Herzen im Dreivierteltakt (Der verlorene Walzer) (1933)

Oscar Straus (1870–1954)
 Ein Walzertraum (1907)
 Der tapfere Soldat (The Chocolate Soldier) (1908)
 Drei Walzer (1935)
 Bozena (1952)

Johann Strauss II (1825–1899)
 Indigo und die vierzig Räuber (1871)
 Der Karneval in Rom (1873)
 Die Fledermaus (The Bat) (1874)
 Cagliostro in Wien (Caliogstro in Vienna) (1875)
 Prinz Methusalem (1877)
 Blindekuh (1878)
 Das Spitzentuch der Königin (1880)
 Der lustige Krieg (1881)
 Eine Nacht in Venedig (A Night in Venice) (1883)
 Der Zigeunerbaron (The Gypsy Baron) (1885)
 Simplicius (1887)
 Fürstin Ninetta (1893)
 Jabuka (1894)
 Waldmeister (1895)
 Die Göttin der Vernunft (1897)
 Wiener Blut (1899)

Heinrich Strecker (1893–1981)
 Ännchen von Tharau (1933)

Arthur Sullivan (1842–1900)
With W. S. Gilbert (Gilbert and Sullivan)
 Trial by Jury (1875)
 The Sorcerer (1877)
 HMS Pinafore, or The Lass That Loved a Sailor (1878)
 The Pirates of Penzance, or The Slave of Duty (1879)
 Patience, or Bunthorne's Bride (1880–1881)
 Iolanthe, or The Peer and the Peri (1882)
 Princess Ida, or Castle Adamant (1883)
 The Mikado, or The Town of Titipu (1884–1885)
 Ruddigore, or The Witch's Curse (1886)
 The Yeomen of the Guard, or The Merryman and His Maid (1888)
 The Gondoliers, or The King of Barataria (1889)
 Utopia Limited, or The Flowers of Progress (1893)
 The Grand Duke, or The Statutory Duel (1895–1896)
With other librettists
Cox and Box, (1866)
The Contrabandista, (1867), revised and re-written as The Chieftain (1897)
The Zoo (1875)
Haddon Hall (1892)
The Rose of Persia (1899)

Franz von Suppé (1819–1895)
 Die schöne Galathee (1865)
 Banditenstreiche (1867)
 Fatinitza (1876)
 Boccaccio (1879)

Albert Szirmai (1880–1967)
 Táncos Huszárok
 Mágnás Miska
 Mézeskalács

Arno Vetterling (1903–1963)
 Liebe in der Lerchengasse (1936)

Gerhard Winkler (1906–1977)
 Premiere in Mailand (1950)

Vincent Youmans (1898–1946)
 No, no, Nanette (1924)

Carl Zeller (1842–1898)
 Der Vogelhändler (1891)
 Der Obersteiger (1894)

Carl Michael Ziehrer (1843–1922)
 König Jérôme oder Immer Lustick (1878)
 Die Landstreicher (1899)
 Die drei Wünsche (1901)
 Der Fremdenführer (1902)
 Der Schätzmeister (1904)
 Fesche Geister (1905)
 Ein tolles Mädel! (1907)

!

cs:Seznam operet
de:Liste von Operetten
nl:Lijst van operettes
sk:Zoznam operiet